The 1949 Cornell Big Red football team was an American football team that represented Cornell University during the 1949 college football season.  In its third season under head coach George K. James, the team compiled a 8–1 record and outscored their opponents by a total of 284 to 111.

Cornell played its home games in Schoellkopf Field in Ithaca, New York.

Schedule

References

Cornell
Cornell Big Red football seasons
Cornell Big Red football